Nonyma insularis is a species of beetle in the family Cerambycidae. It was described by Báguena and Breuning in 1958.

References

insularis
Beetles described in 1958